Hershey's Special Dark is a chocolate bar manufactured by The Hershey Company.

History
In 1894, before the introduction of the milk chocolate Hershey bar in 1900, the Hershey Chocolate Company manufactured and marketed "vanilla sweet chocolate" a semi-sweet chocolate.  This bar has been described as the "first" American candy bar.  The company continued to provide semi-sweet chocolate products and in the 1930s a Not-So-Sweet bar  and in 1939, added the Bitter-Sweet bar to Hershey's Miniatures.  The Hershey's Semi-Sweet bar was being sold in the market in the 1960s.

Miniatures
Hershey's Special Dark is a component of the traditional Hershey's Miniatures assortment first sold in 1939, when the Special Dark was called Bitter-Sweet.

In 2006, Hershey's began selling Hershey's Special Dark Miniatures, which included the plain Special Dark bar, along with dark bars with peanuts (similar to a Mr. Goodbar) and with crisped rice (similar to a Krackel).

Hershey's Extra Dark
Hershey's Extra Dark is a product very similar to the Special Dark. The three varieties are solid chocolate; chocolate with macadamia nuts and dried cranberries; and chocolate with cranberries, blueberries, pomegranate, and almonds. Hershey's marketing emphasizes the antioxidant qualities of these bars' ingredients. Additionally, Hershey's Extra Dark contains 60% cocoa solids, while Hershey's Special Dark contains 45% cocoa solids.

Ingredients
Special Dark is similar to a standard Hershey bar, but is made with a dark (or semi-sweet) variety of chocolate, and contains a higher percentage (45%) of cocoa solids, chocolate liquor and cocoa butter than milk chocolate.

Full ingredients include: Sugar, Chocolate, Cocoa Butter, Cocoa Processed With Alkali, Milk Fat; Lactose (Milk), Soy Lecithin, PGPR, Natural Flavor, Milk

References

External links
 

The Hershey Company brands
Chocolate bars
Products introduced in 1939